HMS C12 was one of 38 C-class submarines built for the Royal Navy in the first decade of the 20th century. The boat survived the First World War and was sold for scrap in 1920.

Design and description
The C class was essentially a repeat of the preceding B class, albeit with better performance underwater. They displaced  on the surface and  submerged. The C-class submarines had a crew of two officers and fourteen ratings.

For surface running, the boats were powered by a single 16-cylinder  Vickers petrol engine that drove one propeller shaft. When submerged the propeller was driven by a  electric motor. They could reach  on the surface and  underwater.

The boats were armed with two 18-inch (45 cm) torpedo tubes in the bow. They could carry a pair of reload torpedoes, but generally did not as they would have to remove an equal weight of fuel in compensation.

Construction and career
C12 was built by Vickers at their Barrow-in-Furness shipyard, laid down on 27 November 1906 and was commissioned on 19 January 1908. The boat was sunk in a collision with a destroyer in the Humber Estuary on 6 October 1918. She was salvaged and recommissioned. C12 was sold for scrap on 2 February 1920.

Notes

References

External links
 MaritimeQuest HMS C12 page

 

British C-class submarines
Ships built in Barrow-in-Furness
Royal Navy ship names
British submarine accidents
Submarines sunk in collisions
Maritime incidents in 1918
1907 ships